The Pine Barrens tree frog (Dryophytes andersonii) is a species of New World tree frog. It is becoming rare due to habitat loss.

Description
Members of the species are predominantly emerald green. The green coloration is bordered by a white stripe, which separates it from a later plum band that extends downwards to cover the belly. The hidden surfaces of their legs are orange to yellow. The belly is covered in white areolae. The toes are partially webbed, while the fingers are free. The pads of both fingers and toes are small.

The key to distinguishing the Pine Barrens tree frog from the similar-appearing American green tree frog (D. cinerea) is the white-bordered lavender stripe on each side of the body in the Pine Barrens tree frog. D. cinerea has only a white stripe in this location.

Habitat
Dryophytes andersonii are primarily found near temporary still or slow waters dominated by shrubs or herbaceous plants. Permanent bodies of water that are home to fish contain fewer and more isolated frogs. Their preferred natural habitats include wet areas in pitch pine forests, intermittent streams and ponds, stream backwaters, Sphagnum bogs, and Atlantic white cedar swamps. They are also found alongside artificial bodies of water such as cranberry bogs, water-filled ruts created by vehicles, flooded borrow pits, and ditches. Adults are primarily found in waterside vegetation, but may be encountered on the ground.

Breeding
D. andersonii prefer to reproduce in isolated, shallow, acidic ponds. The ideal pH level for D. andersonii eggs is between 3.74 and 4.69. The eggs are laid in May and June; the tadpoles metamorphose into adults in July and August.

Calling begins at the end of April and can continue into August. Towards the end of the season, they disperse father away from their breeding sites. The species' comparatively late breeding season, combined with its preference for temporary water sources, makes it vulnerable to droughts and changes in water levels.

Distribution 

Dryophytes andersonii primarily inhabits the Atlantic Coastal Plain. Due to the limited extent of suitable habitats, the species is currently distributed in three disjunct areas in the southeastern United States: the New Jersey Pine Barrens; the Sandhills of North and South Carolina; and the Florida panhandle and southern Alabama. The New Jersey populations are the largest currently recorded. Although one specimen of D. andersonii is known from Richmond County Georgia, a population is not known to currently exist there.

Dryophytes andersonii is the state frog of North Carolina. It was selected through a poll organized by the North Carolina Herpetological Society, in which the Pine Barrens tree frog was chosen alongside the marbled salamander.

Conservation status
Dryophytes andersonii was listed as endangered by the US Fish and Wildlife Service between 1977 and 1983, when additional populations were found in Florida. The IUCN has classified it as Near Threatened as of 1996.

Pine Barrens tree frogs are rarely encountered in sites where nonnative amphibians, such as bullfrogs, and nonnative fish are present, suggesting that they are poor competitors. As a consequence of this, D. andersonii populations found in or near developed and agricultural areas are believed to be the most at risk due to the greater presence of nonnative species there.

The Pine Barrens tree frog is currently listed as Threatened in the state of New Jersey.

In popular culture
The Pine Barrens tree frog was featured in a series of prints by artist Andy Warhol. In 1983, the artist was commissioned to create a portfolio of ten endangered species to raise environmental awareness and included was D. andersonii.

References

External links

Animal Diversity Web - Hyla andersonii (Pine Barrens tree frog)
Pinelands Preservation Alliance - Pine Barrens tree frog photos

Dryophytes
Pine Barrens (New Jersey)
Fauna of the Eastern United States
Amphibians of the United States
Fauna of the Southeastern United States
Amphibians described in 1854
Taxa named by Spencer Fullerton Baird
Symbols of North Carolina